Hurston Wayne Waldrep (born March 1, 2002) is an American college baseball pitcher for the Florida Gators.

Career
Waldrep attended Thomasville High School in Thomasville, Georgia where he played on their baseball team as a pitcher and on their football team as a kicker and punter. He earned All-State honors in both sports. He went unselected in the shortened 2020 Major League Baseball draft and enrolled at the University of Southern Mississippi to play college baseball.

As a freshman at Southern Mississippi in 2021, Waldrep pitched  innings in relief and went 1-0 with a 3.31 ERA and 16 strikeouts. For the 2022 season, he became Southern Mississippi's Sunday starter. Over 17 starts, he went 6-2 with a 3.20 ERA, 140 strikeouts, and 33 walks over ninety innings. After the season, he entered the transfer portal. He later transferred to the University of Florida. That summer, he played with the USA Baseball Collegiate National Team. He entered the 2023 season as a top prospect for the upcoming MLB draft.

References

External links
Southern Miss Golden Eagles bio

2002 births
Living people
Baseball players from Georgia (U.S. state)
Baseball pitchers
Southern Miss Golden Eagles baseball players
United States national baseball team players